Mbamu (also: M´Bamou and Bamu) is an island in the Pool Malebo, a large lake formed by a widening of the River Congo. The island is territory of the Republic of the Congo (Congo Brazzaville). Mbamu is a demilitarized zone under the neutral regime established in the Franco-Belgian Convention of 1908, when these two countries exerted colonial rule over the territories on either side of the River Congo. 

The Pool Malebo has a surface area of 180 km2. Two national capitals are located downriver: to the northwest along the river is Brazzaville, capital of Republic of the Congo. To the south of the pool and river is Kinshasa, capital of the Democratic Republic of the Congo (Congo-Kinshasa).

References

Islands of the Republic of the Congo
Demilitarized zones
Geography of Brazzaville
Kinshasa
Congo River
Lake islands of Africa